Charbel Gomez (born 27 January 2001) is a Beninese international footballer who plays for French club Amiens and Amiens II, as a striker.

References

2001 births
Living people
People from Cotonou
Beninese footballers
Benin international footballers
Amiens SC players
Ligue 2 players
Championnat National 3 players
Association football forwards
Beninese expatriate footballers
Beninese expatriate sportspeople in France
Expatriate footballers in France